This is a list of lighthouses in Togo.

Lighthouses

See also
List of lighthouses in Ghana (to the west)
List of lighthouses in Benin (to the east)
 Lists of lighthouses and lightvessels

References

External links
 

Togo
Lighthouses
Lighthouses